Booneville School District  is a public school district based in Booneville, Logan County, Arkansas. The school district serves more than 1,300 students in kindergarten through grade 12 and employs more than 220 faculty and staff at its three schools.

The district encompasses  of land in Logan, Scott, and Sebastian counties serving all or portions of the Booneville, Magazine and Waldron.

Schools

Secondary education 
 Booneville High School, serving grades 10 through 12.
 Booneville Junior High School, serving grades 7 through 9.

Elementary education 
 Booneville Elementary School, serving kindergarten through grade 6.

References

External links
 

Education in Logan County, Arkansas
Education in Scott County, Arkansas
Education in Sebastian County, Arkansas
School districts in Arkansas